"Homer Goes to Prep School" is the ninth episode of the twenty-fourth season of the American animated television series The Simpsons, and the 517th episode overall in the series. It originally aired on the Fox network in the United States on January 6, 2013.

Plot
Homer and Marge take the kids to a kids' fun center, which disappoints Homer as he has to watch the kids. Some kids end up in a secret room where they are dressed in black suits and white shirts and told, "Welcome to the Mormon Church, America's most respectable cult."  However, upon seeing that the other dads have abandoned their duties, he does so as well. When a child leaves the building, it triggers an automatic alarm that shuts down the entire facility. Marge and the mothers pass the time by telling each other stories of childbirth, but the fathers instantly turn on each other and fight savagely. Homer is traumatized, and on a routine trip to Moe's Tavern, he admits his doubt of civilization's ability to survive a worldwide catastrophe and meets a man named Lloyd (guest voice Tom Waits), who reveals himself to be a survivalist "prepper". Lloyd introduces him to the world of survivalists, and Homer quickly adopts their ideals and methods, storing necessary equipment in the family basement.

Studying how to become a survivalist, he neglects his job at the Springfield Nuclear Power Plant, and as a result, an electromagnetic pulse blacks out all of the power in Springfield. When Mayor Quimby cannot find a solution to the problem, Homer is prompted to take his family to a base camp his fellow survivalists, who include Herman Hermann and Superintendent Chalmers, have set up. However, after an argument with Marge over their new lives, Homer begins to doubt the other survivalists when they refuse to share their stored equipment to the others in Springfield. Realizing that everyone else needs the equipment, he steals it all that night and flees back to Springfield with the family. The survivalists quickly catch on and gain pursuit. The Simpsons manage to make it back to Springfield, only to find that the townspeople have quickly gotten over the EMP burst and recovered as a society, much to Lloyd's dismay. Lisa tells everyone that a big lesson has been learned from all of this; meanwhile, a meteor carrying a horde of zombies approaches the Earth.

Reception

Ratings
The episode got a 4.2 rating in the 18-49 demographic and was watched by a total of 8.97 million viewers making it the most watched show on Animation Domination that night.

Critical reception
The episode received mixed reviews, with praise going to the humor and the criticism directed at the plot. Robert David Sullivan of The A.V. Club gave the episode a C, calling it a "rather lifeless episode."

Teresa Lopez from TV Fanatic said "There quite a few amusing The Simpsons quotes to go along with the great sight gags and parodies of survivalist videos, but there wasn't much else new or exciting about the episode. Being topical can only make a show somewhat entertaining, so this episode only managed to be a little above average."

References

External links 
 
 "Homer Goes to Prep School" at theSimpsons.com

The Simpsons (season 24) episodes
2013 American television episodes
Survival fiction